WEMU (89.1 MHz) is a public radio station owned by Eastern Michigan University in Ypsilanti, Michigan.  On weekdays, it carries NPR News and Information shows in morning and afternoon drive time, with jazz programs heard the rest of the day.  On weekends, a mix of jazz, blues, adult alternative and Latin jazz shows are heard, along with some NPR weekend talk shows and EMU sports broadcasts.

WEMU has an effective radiated power (ERP) of 15,500 watts.  The transmitter is on West Clark Road at Laforge Road in Ypsilanti, near the EMU campus.  The signal covers Washtenaw County, Ann Arbor and the Western suburbs of Detroit.  Located online at WEMU.org, the station streams live 24 hours a day.

History 
It originally broadcast on 88.1 MHz with studios in the Quirk Building on Eastern Michigan University's campus. In 1976, the station moved to King Hall, and in February 1977, WEMU began to feature a primarily jazz format. Later that year, in October 1977, WEMU changed to its current 89.1 FM frequency. The next major addition came on April 7, 2004, when WEMU added digital broadcasting. Located online at WEMU.org, the station streams live 24 hours a day.

According to a 2017 tour of WEMU, the station holds one of the largest jazz broadcast libraries in the United States, with nearly 100,000 records and CDs in its collection.

Still broadcast out of King Hall on the Eastern Michigan University Campus, WEMU currently shares the building with the student newspaper The Eastern Echo and the Early College Alliance program.

Programming 
WEMU carries the drive time NPR news programs All Things Considered and Morning Edition, in addition to other NPR and Public Radio International (PRI) information and cultural programming. WEMU also hosts the EMU sports network and carries EMU football and basketball broadcasts.

According to the WEMU radio schedule, weekdays offer six hours of locally hosted jazz between Morning Edition and All Things Considered, with the syndicated jazz show Pubjazz overnight. Local weekday jazz show include 89.1 Jazz with Michael Jewett and The Break. Starting on Friday nights, weekend programming includes a mix of news and music shows, both local and national. Weekend local shows include From Memphis to Motown, The Roots Music Project, Cuban Fantasy, Sunday Best, Grooveyard, The In Crowd, and Big City Blues Cruise.

WEMU is licensed for HD Radio operations.  It broadcasts a mixed format of traditional and smooth jazz on its HD2 digital subchannel.  The HD2 formerly aired a mix of folk, roots and Americana music.

References

External links
 
 Eastern Michigan University
 National Public Radio
 Public Radio International
 Michiguide.com - WEMU History

NPR member stations
Jazz radio stations in the United States
Eastern Michigan University
EMU
Radio stations established in 1965
1965 establishments in Michigan
EMU